Nifon may refer to:
A village in the commune of Hamcearca, Romania
Nephon I of Constantinople, Ecumenical Patriarch of Constantinople, 1310–1314
Niphon of Kafsokalyvia (1316–1411), Greek Orthodox saint and hermit
Patriarch Niphon of Alexandria, Greek Patriarch of Alexandria, 1366–1385
Nephon II of Constantinople, Ecumenical Patriarch of Constantinople, 1486–1488, 1497–1498, 1502
Nifon Rusailă (1789–1875), Metropolitan of Ungro-Wallachia, 1850–1865, and first Metropolitan-Primate of Romania, 1865–1875
Nifon Niculescu (1858–1923), Romanian Orthodox Bishop of the Lower Danube
Nifon, an alternative form of Nippon (Japan)